Tomáš Josl  (born 12 November 1984) is a Czech footballer who is currently playing for FK Chropyně.

Career

1. FC Tatran Prešov
In summer 2006, Josl moved to 1. FC Tatran Prešov.

Ruch Chorzów
In August 2011, he joined Polish club Ruch Chorzów on one-half year contract.

FK Chropyně
In October 2019, Josl joined FK Chropyně.

References

External links
 
 
 Official club website
 

1984 births
Living people
Czech footballers
Czech expatriate footballers
Association football defenders
FC Fastav Zlín players
1. HFK Olomouc players
FC Vysočina Jihlava players
1. FC Tatran Prešov players
Ruch Chorzów players
SK Hanácká Slavia Kroměříž players
NorthEast United FC players
FC Rapid București players
FK Viktoria Žižkov players
KFC Komárno players
MFK Vyškov players
Czech First League players
Slovak Super Liga players
Liga I players
Czech National Football League players
Indian Super League players
Czech expatriate sportspeople in Slovakia
Czech expatriate sportspeople in Poland
Czech expatriate sportspeople in India
Czech expatriate sportspeople in Romania
Expatriate footballers in Slovakia
Expatriate footballers in Poland
Expatriate footballers in India
Expatriate footballers in Romania
Sportspeople from Přerov